CBS, formerly Columbia Broadcasting System, is an American TV and radio network.

CBS may also refer to:

Business and organisations

Businesses
 CBS Corporation, 2005 to 2019
 CBS Records (disambiguation), several uses
 Christian Broadcasting System, a South Korean Christian TV network

National organisations
  ('Central Investigation Bureau of Police'), a Polish police unit
 Statistics Netherlands, the Dutch national institute of statistics
 Centre for Excellence in Basic Sciences, an autonomous Indian national institute in Mumbai
 Israel Central Bureau of Statistics, the Israeli national institute of statistics
 Canadian Blood Services, a non-profit charitable organization

Educational organisations
 CBS, the name of several Christian Brothers Schools
 CBS International Business School, Germany
 Calcutta Boys' School, India
 Colonel Brown Cambridge School, Dehradun, India
 Columbia Business School, New York City, U.S.
 Copenhagen Business School, Denmark
 La Ceiba Bilingual School, Honduras
 University of Minnesota College of Biological Sciences, U.S.
 Westerdijk Institute (formerly ), the Dutch institute of fungus studies

Religious organisations
 Campus Bible Study, at the University of New South Wales, Australia
 Campus by the Sea, in Catalina Island, California, U.S.
 Confraternity of the Blessed Sacrament, an Anglican devotional society

Science and technology
 CBS catalyst (Corey–Bakshi–Shibata catalyst), in organic chemistry
 CBS domain, a protein domain in molecular biology
 CBS reduction (Corey-Bakshi-Shibata reduction), a chemical reaction
 Charles Bonnet syndrome, a type of psychophysical visual disturbance
 Combined braking system, on a motorcycle or scooter
 Container-based sanitation, a toilet system 
 Component-Based Servicing, a management feature new to Windows Vista operating system
 Concrete block structure, a building structure built from concrete masonry units
 Cystathionine beta synthase, an enzyme 
 Credit-based shaper, in IEEE 802.1Qav time-sensitive networking

Transportation 
 Coatbridge Sunnyside railway station, Scotland, station code CBS
 Columbus station, Wisconsin, United States, station code CBS

Other uses 
 Central Broadcasting System, or Radio Taiwan International, Republic of China radio station
 Chronological Bible Storying, a method of orally communicating portions of the Bible 
 Conception Bay South, a town in Newfoundland and Labrador, Canada, known as CBS
 Croatia Boat Show, a boat show in Split, Croatia

See also 

 CBS Television (disambiguation)
 CBS-FM (disambiguation)